Hemidonax is a genus of bivalve molluscs. It is the only genus in the family Hemidonacidae, which is the only family in the superfamily Hemidonacoidea in the order Venerida.

Species in the genus Hemidonax:

References

Hemidonacidae
Bivalve genera